The meridian 81° east of Greenwich is a line of longitude that extends from the North Pole across the Arctic Ocean, Asia, the Indian Ocean, the Southern Ocean, and Antarctica to the South Pole.

The 81st meridian east forms a great circle with the 99th meridian west.

From Pole to Pole
Starting at the North Pole and heading south to the South Pole, the 81st meridian east passes through:

{| class="wikitable plainrowheaders"
! scope="col" width="120" | Co-ordinates
! scope="col" | Country, territory or sea
! scope="col" | Notes
|-
| style="background:#b0e0e6;" | 
! scope="row" style="background:#b0e0e6;" | Arctic Ocean
| style="background:#b0e0e6;" |
|-
| style="background:#b0e0e6;" | 
! scope="row" style="background:#b0e0e6;" | Kara Sea
| style="background:#b0e0e6;" |
|-
| 
! scope="row" | 
| Krasnoyarsk Krai
|-
| style="background:#b0e0e6;" | 
! scope="row" style="background:#b0e0e6;" | Yenisei Gulf
| style="background:#b0e0e6;" |
|-valign="top"
| 
! scope="row" | 
| Krasnoyarsk Krai Yamalo-Nenets Autonomous Okrug — from  Khanty-Mansi Autonomous Okrug — from  Tomsk Oblast — from  Novosibirsk Oblast — from  Altai Krai — from 
|-
| 
! scope="row" | 
|East Kazakhstan, Almaty Region
|-valign="top"
| 
! scope="row" | 
| Xinjiang Tibet — from 
|-
| 
! scope="row" | 
| Uttarakhand — for about 7 km
|-
| 
! scope="row" | 
|Sudurpashchim Pradesh
|-valign="top"
| 
! scope="row" | 
| Uttar Pradesh, passing just east of Lucknow at  Madhya Pradesh — from  Chhattisgarh — from  Telangana — from   Andhra Pradesh — from 
|-
| style="background:#b0e0e6;" | 
! scope="row" style="background:#b0e0e6;" | Indian Ocean
| style="background:#b0e0e6;" | Bay of Bengal
|-
| 
! scope="row" | 
|Eastern Province, North Central Province, Uva, Southern Province
|-
| style="background:#b0e0e6;" | 
! scope="row" style="background:#b0e0e6;" | Indian Ocean
| style="background:#b0e0e6;" |
|-
| style="background:#b0e0e6;" | 
! scope="row" style="background:#b0e0e6;" | Southern Ocean
| style="background:#b0e0e6;" |
|-
| 
! scope="row" | Antarctica
| Australian Antarctic Territory, claimed by 
|-
|}

See also
80th meridian east
82nd meridian east

e081 meridian east